Mützelburger Beeke is a small border river of Germany (Mecklenburg-Vorpommern) and Poland (West Pomeranian Voivodeship). It takes its name from the Polish village Myślibórz Wielki (German: Groß Mützelburg). It is formed at the outflow of the Großer Mützelburger See, and it discharges into the Neuwarper See, a bay of the Szczecin Lagoon.

See also
List of rivers of Mecklenburg-Vorpommern

Rivers of Mecklenburg-Western Pomerania
Rivers of Poland
Rivers of West Pomeranian Voivodeship
Rivers of Germany
International rivers of Europe